Morten Kærså  (born 26 September 1957) is a Danish composer, pianist, singer and producer. He is known from the bands Sneakers and Moonjam.

See also
List of Danish composers

References
EWH profile

Danish composers
Male composers
1957 births
Living people
Place of birth missing (living people)
Danish pianists
20th-century Danish male singers
20th-century Danish male musicians